(The) Bucketts Way is a  rural road that links Gloucester to Taree and Raymond Terrace, in New South Wales, Australia. A former alignment of Pacific Highway, it was later named after the Bucketts Mountains, a prominent mountain range near Gloucester. The entire route is designated as Tourist Route 2.

Route
It then turns north-north-east and then north for  until it reaches Gloucester, crossing the Avon River on the way. The North Coast Railway line runs parallel with it from just north-east of Stroud Road to Gloucester. At Gloucester, Bucketts Way meets the southern terminus of Thunderbolts Way that leads to the Northern Tablelands and various other national parks and riverside camping reserves along the way. The Bucketts Way continues eastwards to Krambach, ending at the intersection with Manning River Drive in Purfleet just south of Taree, close to its interchange with Pacific Highway.

It provides access to the Barrington Tops National Park, and is used by tourists as a very scenic alternative to Pacific Highway. The Bucketts Way travels through two council areas: Port Stephens and Mid-Coast Council.

History
The passing of the Main Roads Act of 1924 through the Parliament of New South Wales provided for the declaration of Main Roads, roads partially funded by the State government through the Main Roads Board (later the Department of Main Roads, and eventually Transport for NSW). North Coast Highway was declared (as Main Road No. 10) 8 August 1928 from Twelve Mile Creek to Purfleet (continuing southwards to Hexham, and northwards via Port Macquarie, Coffs Harbour, Ballina, Byron Bay and Murwillumbah to Tweed Heads. With the passing of the Main Roads (Amendment) Act of 1929 to provide for additional declarations of State Highways and Trunk Roads, this was amended to State Highway 10 on 8 April 1929. North Coast Highway was renamed Pacific Highway (and extended south to North Sydney) on 26 May 1931.

A new alignment of Pacific Highway was constructed between Twelve Mile Creek via Karuah, Bulahdelah and Nabiac to Purfleet; as a result, the former alignment via Stroud and Gloucester was re-declared as Trunk Road 90 on 30 July 1952. Trunk Road 90 was officially named The Bucketts Way on 18 October 1972.

The passing of the Roads Act of 1993 through the Parliament of New South Wales updated road classifications and the way they could be declared within New South Wales. Under this act, the northern end of Main Road 90 (formerly Trunk Road 90) was re-aligned from Krambach via Dyers Crossing to end at the intersection with Pacific Highway in Nabiac on 22 November 1996; the southern end of Main Road 192 was extended to cover the former alignment between Burrell Creek and Krambach (and continuing north via Wingham to Taree), with the road from Burrell Creek via Tinonee and Purfleet currently undeclared. Bucketts Way today, as parts of Main Roads 90 and 192, still retain these declarations.

Some councillors of the former Gloucester Shire had proposed renaming the section of Bucketts Way south of Gloucester to Thunderbolts Way in December 2004, as is shown on some tourist maps. This would result in one continuously named road stretching from Pacific Highway near Raymond Terrace to New England Highway at Uralla and beyond. However, there was significant community opposition to a name change.

Major junctions

See also

 Highways in Australia
 List of highways in New South Wales

References

Roads in the Hunter Region
Port Stephens Council